The 1935 Michigan State Spartans football team represented Michigan State College as an independent during the 1935 college football season. In their third season under head coach Charlie Bachman, the Spartans compiled a 6–2 record and won their annual rivalry game with Michigan by a 25 to 6 score. In inter-sectional play, the team defeated Kansas (42–0) and the Loyola Lions (27–0) but lost to Boston College (18–6).

Guard Sid Wagner was a consensus first-team player on the 1935 College Football All-America Team.

Schedule

Game summaries

Michigan
On October 5, Michigan State opened its 1935 season with its annual rivalry game against the Michigan Wolverines. The Spartans had defeated the Wolverines in 1934 for the first time since 1915. Led by head coach Charlie Bachman and left halfback Kurt Warmbein, the Spartans again defeated the Wolverienes, 25 to 6. It was the first time the Spartans had defeated the Wolverines in consecutive games.

References

Michigan State
Michigan State Spartans football seasons
Michigan State Spartans football